Caoayan, officially the Municipality of Caoayan, is a 4th class municipality in the province of Ilocos Sur, Philippines. According to the 2020 census, it has a population of 19,574 people.

Etymology
During pre-Spanish times the port of Pandan was an important trading post for Chinese and inter-island vessels, and one of the commodities once traded there was bamboo.  With the arrival of the Spaniards came the project to identify the names of places in the Philippines.  Spaniards, patrolling the area for pirates known as tirong, came to a place near the island called Puro, and asked the name of the place.  Thinking that the Spaniards wanted to know the name of the bamboo floating in rafts on the Baggoc River waiting to be traded, they answered "kawayan."  The Spaniard then listed the place's name as Caoayan.

From that time on, the place's registered name was Caoayan, and has been registered as a barrio of the capital town Bigaan.  It became a parish in 1825. The first missionaries that founded Saint Paul College of Ilocos Sur landed in Pandan. A commemorative marker stands at Pandan Port to commemorate the event.

History
Caoayan, which was once a barrio of Ciudad Fernandina, now Vigan, became a municipality in 1911. Don Dimas Querubin was the town's founder and got elected as the first municipal mayor. He was succeeded by his son, Don Asterio Q. Querubin I, who served for four terms and became president of the Mayors' League of Ilocos Sur.

Geography

Climate

Barangays
Caoayan is politically subdivided into 17 barangays. These barangays are headed by elected officials: Barangay Captain, Barangay Council, whose members are called Barangay Councilors. All are elected every three years.

Demographics

In the 2020 census, Caoayan had a population of 19,574.

Economy 

Due to its geographical location, fishing has been the main source of livelihood of the inhabitants. Next is agriculture where farmers planted onions, tomatoes, rice and corn bound. The town is also known for its loom-weaving industry which dates back before Spanish regime. Palafox and Associates have declared Caoayan as the fish-bowl and onion basket of Ilocos Sur.

Boat-sailing was one of the major industries of Caoayan but was eased out as means of transportation with the onset of modern highways especially those connecting the Ilocos provinces to Manila and the Cagayan Valley. The provincial government has recognized the Caoayano skill by awarding locals who are engaged in boat-making and calesa-manufacturing as living legends of Ilocos Sur.

Currently, LGU-Caoayan has launched the country's first ever One-Barangay, One-Product (OBOP) program. Although its official One-Town, One-Product (OTOP) as per DTI's initiatives is Abel Iloko, only 5 out of the 17 barangays are into loom-weaving. Under Mayor Goulart, the OBOP was designed to give all barangays equal economic development opportunity. Under this program, non- Abel Iloko barangays are empowered to adopt their respective OBOPs depending on the raw materials that are indigenous and abundant in their communities.

The OBOP has now produced a wide array of local products: processed Rosangis (clam shells), Bagoong Ipon, native Cakes and Delicacies, processed peanuts, Pickled Singkamas (turnips), Smoked Tilapia, Corn Husk souvenir items, Water Lily handicrafts, Smoked/De-boned Bangus (milkfish), with others that are following soon. Abel Iloko weavers have also undergone training programs that will enable them to come up with high-end Abel outputs.

Caoayan is also presently riding on the coattails of Vigan, which has been declared as one of the new 7 wonder cities of the world. To be able to get a fair share of the city's tourist influx, Caoayan opened the Pinakbet Farm in Barangay Nansuagao, offering the quintessential Ilokano dish - Pinakbet - as its centerpiece. Currently opened is the Caoayan Choco Surf Point in Barangay Manangat, a resort-type destination that offers surfing and other water-based sports classes, rejuvenating massage and the Black Sand exfoliating rub, and the resto-bar that offers drinks and seafood paella as the chef's choice. These tourism-based projects have been launched to achieve the town's vision of improving all Caoayanos' standard of living through additional revenue and employment generation.

Government
Caoayan, belonging to the first congressional district of the province of Ilocos Sur, is governed by a mayor designated as its local chief executive and by a municipal council as its legislative body in accordance with the Local Government Code. The mayor, vice mayor, and the councilors are elected directly by the people through an election which is being held every three years.

Elected officials

Notable personalities

Elpidio Quirino - 6th President of the Philippines

References

External links

Philippine Standard Geographic Code
Philippine Census Information
Local Governance Performance Management System

Municipalities of Ilocos Sur
Populated places on the Abra River